Horace Clive Miller OBE (30 April 1893 – 1980) was a pioneering Australian aviator and co-founder of MacRobertson Miller Airlines (MMA).

He flew in the 1929 Western Australian Centenary Air Race, winning handicap honours.

The main road to the Perth International Airport Terminal 1 is named Horrie Miller Drive in honour of the aviator.

See also
 West Australian Airways

Footnotes

References
 Access road to new International Airport to be named "Horrie Miller Drive" in honour of WA pioneer aviator The West Australian, 1 Dec. 1984, p. 40
 Dunn, Frank, (1984) Speck in the sky : a history of Airlines of Western Australia Perth, W.A: Airlines of W.A 
 Lewis, Julie (1987) Interview with Dunbar Hooper, and Horrie Miller (reference to Woods, Jimmy, 1893-1975 and WA Airways )  Battye Library Oral History transcript
 Miller, Horace Clive (Horrie) (1968 or 1976) Early birds : magnificent men of Australian aviation between the wars Adelaide : Rigby, Series Seal books 
 Court, Charles, Sir, (1995) Horace Clive Miller ("Horrie Miller"), 1893-1980 : from barnstorming joyrides to boardrooms / an address by Sir Charles Court in presenting the 1995 Sir Norman Brearley oration at W.A. Club, Perth, W.A. on 23 August 1995. Perth, W.A.: Civil Aviation Historical Society (W.A. Division), 1995.
 National Archives of Australia World War I service records search, accessed 7 July 2007.
 Mervyn W. Prime, 2011, "Horrie Miller", Aviation Australia, accessed 16 June 2011.
Perkins, Matthew, 2008, "Who is Horrie Miller?", ABC Radio Perth, accessed 6 August 2019

1893 births
1980 deaths
People from Perth, Western Australia
People from Ballarat
Australian military personnel of World War I
Royal Australian Air Force officers
Australian aviators
Officers of the Order of the British Empire